The Division of Riverina is an Australian electoral division in the state of New South Wales.

Geography
Since 1984, federal electoral division boundaries in Australia have been determined at redistributions by a redistribution committee appointed by the Australian Electoral Commission. Redistributions occur for the boundaries of divisions in a particular state, and they occur every seven years, or sooner if a state's representation entitlement changes or when divisions of a state are malapportioned.

History

The division was proclaimed in 1900, and was one of the original 65 divisions to be contested at the first federal election, although it was abolished between 1984 and 1993, so has not been contested at every federal election. The division was named after the Riverina region in which it is located, though its modern borders do not correspond exactly with the Riverina region. The division covers a primarily agricultural, rural area with many small towns.

In the 1984 redistribution, the division was abolished and replaced by Riverina-Darling, but in the 1993 redistribution it was re-created.

Since its re-creation in 1993, it has been a safe Nationals seat. Its first incarnation tilted toward the Nationals' predecessor, the Country Party, for much of its history, but was occasionally taken by Labor during high-tide elections. It was fairly marginal for most of the 1970s and early 1980s, when it included the strongly pro-Labor mining towns of Broken Hill and Cobar which have now been transferred to Farrer and Parkes.

The division is located in South-West rural New South Wales, generally following the Murrumbidgee River valley. It includes the larger city of Wagga Wagga, as well as the towns of Cowra, Forbes, Junee, Cootamundra, Temora, West Wyalong, Young, Tumut and Gundagai. The Sturt Highway runs along the length of the division, and it contains a large section of the Newell Highway.

The Division of Riverina also contains the major town of Parkes which has the same name as the bordering Division of Parkes.

The seat has previously been held by Al Grassby, Minister for Immigration in the Whitlam Government. The current Member for Riverina, since the 2010 federal election, is Michael McCormack, former Deputy Prime Minister and leader of the National Party of Australia from 2018 to 2021.

Members

Election results

References

External links
 Division of Riverina – Australian Electoral Commission

Electoral divisions of Australia
Constituencies established in 1901
Constituencies disestablished in 1984
Constituencies established in 1993
1901 establishments in Australia
1984 disestablishments in Australia
1993 establishments in Australia